Musik für ein Haus is a group-composition project devised by Karlheinz Stockhausen for the 1968 Darmstädter Ferienkurse. Fourteen composers and twelve instrumentalists participated, with the resulting performance lasting four hours. It was not regarded by Stockhausen as a composition belonging solely to himself, and therefore was not assigned a number in his catalog of works.

History
Since the late 1950s Stockhausen had been considering a piece to be called Kammermusik (Chamber Music), which would have involved the construction on a stage of a number of chambers (like a multiple stage set), in each of which musicians could be isolated from the others with the sounds of their performances being combined from outside. At the same time, there would be opportunities for individual musicians to move from one chamber to another, in order to produce constantly changing configurations. Stockhausen never realised this idea, but for the 1968 Darmstädter Ferienkurse Stockhausen organised a composition seminar as a successor to the previous year's Ensemble.

Between the original planning, which began as early as November 1967, and the start of the courses in August 1968, Stockhausen experienced a personal crisis that changed the shape of the project. Following the premiere of Kurzwellen in Bremen on 5 May 1968, Stockhausen received a letter from his second wife, Mary Bauermeister, informing him that she would not be returning from America and declaring that their marriage was at an end. The resulting depressive episode prompted Stockhausen to a hunger strike, during which he read Satprem's book on Sri Aurobindo. The result was a new form of composition for Stockhausen, the fifteen texts of Aus den sieben Tagen. He called this intuitive music, and resolved to use these verbally described processes as the basis of the Darmstadt composition studio, which lasted for the seventeen days preceding the Ferienkurse. As part of his efforts to sharpen the participants' awareness for this new kind of composing, Stockhausen scheduled some seminar sessions late at night or early in the morning, which included listening to recordings of Japanese Gagaku and temple music, as well as field trips to services at a Jewish synagogue in Frankfurt and a Russian Orthodox church, and a specially arranged Catholic mass at a Capuchin monastery.

Stockhausen initially selected twelve composers from a larger number of applicants. Several guest participants were also admitted, and of these two additional composers, Clare Franco (USA) and Jens-Peter Ostendorf (Germany) contributed to the final product. The fourteen participating composers and their works were:

Twelve instrumentalists had also been invited:
  (flute)
 Heinz Holliger (oboe)
 Josef Horák (bass clarinet)
 János Mészáros (bassoon)
 Georges Barboteu (horn)
 Pierre Thibaud (trumpet)
 Vinko Globokar (trombone)
  (electronium)
 Aloys Kontarsky (keyboard instruments)
 Saschko Gawriloff (violin)
 Othello Liesmann (cello)
 Georg Nothdorf (contrabass)
They were joined by Johannes Fritsch (viola), and David C. Johnson (alto flute and electronics).

Stockhausen began by introducing the participants to the fifteen newly composed text compositions of his cycle Aus den sieben Tagen, and informed them that this mode of composition was what he wanted them to use themselves for the project. They did not all take him seriously at first, nor understand clearly his intentions. Outside of the seminar, during meal breaks and other personal conversations the participating composers came up with a number of light-hearted parodies of Stockhausen's texts. Jaroslav Wolf was the undisputed master of this genre, taking Stockhausen's Unbegrentzt (Unlimited): "Play a sound with the certainty that you have an infinite amount of time and space" and turning it into: "Do in and with the hall what you want with the certainty that the composer has enough money to cover all breakages." Gehlhaar countered with, "Play with the certainty that you'll receive your fee in any case".

In the course of discussion and critique of submitted texts, three important criteria were formulated"
 Economy and precision of verbal formulation of a musical process
 Guarantee the musical quality
 Compulsory eruption of the process from the confines of traditional thinking habits

Although the serious texts ultimately developed for the project adopt some of the traits of Stockhausen's texts (in particular, addressing the performers with the second-person-familiar Du) they differed in significant and understandable ways from the proposed models. Many of them reflected the knowledge that there would be interaction with other pieces, but they are also longer and more "practical" than most of the texts of Aus den sieben Tagen. Stockhausen himself developed five new text pieces during the seminars, which would later become part of a second collection of text pieces, Für kommende Zeiten (For Times to Come).

After the experience of Ensemble and Musik für ein Haus, Stockhausen continued the idea of simultaneous performances in different spaces with a project for the Beethovenhalle in Bonn, including a mammoth composition Fresco for four orchestral groups, with unhappy results. He also planned a sequel composition-studio project for the 1970 Darmstadt courses, which was to have been performed outdoors in the woods surrounding Schloss Kranichstein. It was provisionally titled Musik im Wald (Music in the Woods), but in the end Stockhausen abandoned the idea in favour of a series of retrospective analytical lectures.

Analysis

The shape of the whole was formed around the spaces in which it was performed, and the
technical arrangement for the amplification of sound and the linking of microphones and speakers between the various rooms employed. While the Moller-Haus predetermined the shape of the spaces, the technical setup was designed by Stockhausen together with Ludwig Klapproth, the technical director of the Ferienkurse.

The simultaneous performances in different rooms on three different floors of the Moller-Haus were synchronized by Stockhausen as different layers of a polyphonic composition. The audience could pass from one layer to another by moving from room to room, but the combined effect could only be heard over loudspeakers in the basement control room, where none of the performers were.

References

Sources

 Gojowy, Detlef. 1972. [Review of] "Fred Ritzel, Musik für ein Haus. Kompositionsstudio Karlheinz Stockhausen. Internationale Ferienkurse für Neue Musik Darmstadt 1968". Musik & Bildung: Zeitschrift für Musikerziehung 4, no. 10: 483.

Further reading

 Cott, Jonathan. 1973. Stockhausen: Conversations with the Composer. New York: Simon and Schuster.
 Hommel, Friedrich. 1968. "Yoga am Notenpult: Ein Experiment von Karlheinz Stockhausen in Darmstadt". Frankfurter Allgemeine Zeitung (3 September).
 Maconie, Robin. 2005. Other Planets: The Music of Karlheinz Stockhausen. Lanham, Maryland, Toronto, Oxford: Scarecrow Press. .
 Stockhausen, Karlheinz. 1971a. "Musik für ein Haus". Texte zur Musik 3 (1963–1970), edited by Dieter Schnebel, 216–221. DuMont Dokumente. Cologne: Verlag M. DuMont Schauberg.
 Stockhausen, Karlheinz. 1971b. "Kriterien". Texte zur Musik 3 (1963–1970), edited by Dieter Schnebel, 222–229. DuMont Dokumente. Cologne: Verlag M. DuMont Schauberg.

1968 compositions
Collaborations in classical music
Compositions by Karlheinz Stockhausen
Process music pieces
Spatial music